Twitchell Mountain is a summit in the Central New York Region of New York located in the Town of Webb in Herkimer County, north-northeast of Big Moose. Twitchell Lake is located southeast of Twitchell Mountain. Mount Tom is located east of Twitchell Mountain.

References

Mountains of Herkimer County, New York
Mountains of New York (state)